The Karachi Interbank Offered Rate, commonly known as KIBOR, is a daily reference rate based on the interest rates at which banks offer to lend unsecured funds to other banks in the Karachi wholesale (or "interbank") money market. The banks used it as a benchmark in their lending to corporate sector.

It is also known as the benchmark rate and is published by Financial Market Association of Pakistan.

Tenors
 1 week
 2 weeks
 1 month
 3 months
 6 months
 9 months
 1 year

See also 
LIBOR
Euribor
Leverage (finance)
Margin (finance)

Notes

Reference rates
Banking in Pakistan